Abhi To Main Jawan Hoon (Devnagari: अभी ताे मैॱ जवान हॅू) is a Hindi comedy film directed by Amjad Khan released in 1989. Sachin, Anjan Srivastav and Bharat Bhushan played the pivotal roles in the film.

Plot
Amar (Sachin) falls in love with a man hater Geeta (Sohani), who lives with her retired Major uncle (Anjan Srivastav) and is also fed up with her bad cousin (Shehzad Khan). In order to win Geeta's heart, her uncle and Amar make a plan. Geeta needs some money to get rid of her cousin. Amar disguises himself as a dying sixty-year-old man Dilfekh, who has enough money. At first Geeta doesn't want to marry him but her teacher explains that the marriage will be a short one because Dilfekh will not live long. Geeta marries him and then finds out the truth.

Cast
 Sachin as Amar
 Sohani as Geeta
 Anjan Srivastav
 Shehzad Khan
 Bharat Bhushan
 Viju Khote
 Kalpana Iyer

Music
"Eena Meena Deeka" - Kumar Sanu
"Jane Kaha Kab De Jaye Dhokha" - Anuradha Paudwal, Mohammed Aziz
"Jawani Me Budhapa Hai" - Amit Kumar
"Mai To Aarti Utaru Re Maharani Geeta Ki" - Hariharan

References

External links
 

1989 films
1989 comedy films
1980s Hindi-language films
Films scored by Anand–Milind
Films scored by C. Ramchandra
Indian comedy-drama films